Tramog or Tramo, also called Zhamog or Zhamo in Chinese, is a town and the county seat of Pome County in the Nyingchi Prefecture, Tibet region of China. Being the county seat, it is also referred to as the Pome town or Pomi town.

See also
List of towns and villages in Tibet

References

Populated places in Nyingchi